Sean Collins (born February 9, 1983) is an American former professional ice hockey player. He was selected by the Colorado Avalanche in the 9th round (289th overall) of the 2002 NHL Entry Draft.

Playing career
Collins was the third last player (289th overall) selected in the 2002 NHL Entry Draft. When drafted, Collins was playing with the New Hampshire Wildcats men's ice hockey team of NCAA's Division I Hockey East Association where he scored 77 goals and 96 assists in his four-year career with the UNH Wildcats.

He began his professional career in 2005. In the 2005–06 ECHL season he scored 27 goals and added 49 assists to lead the Wheeling Nailers in points, and the following year he posted identical numbers. Collins played three seasons (2005–08) for the Nailers, recording 69 goals and 139 assists for a total of 208 points. He had two AHL call-ups in 2006-07, playing three games for the Philadelphia Phantoms and four games for the Worcester Sharks. In 2008–09 he signed for Sport in the Mestis, the second-tier league in Finland, but played just four games before returning to North America with the Tulsa Oilers in the Central Hockey League.

Career statistics

Awards and honors

References

External links

1983 births
American men's ice hockey forwards
Colorado Avalanche draft picks
Ice hockey players from Massachusetts
Living people
New Hampshire Wildcats men's ice hockey players
Philadelphia Phantoms players
Tulsa Oilers (1992–present) players
University of New Hampshire alumni
Vaasan Sport players
Wheeling Nailers players
Wilkes-Barre/Scranton Penguins players
Worcester Sharks players
People from Reading, Massachusetts
Sportspeople from Middlesex County, Massachusetts
AHCA Division I men's ice hockey All-Americans